The Coporolo is an intermittent river in Angola. It flows through Dombe Grande in Benguela Province. It has sometimes been considered a permanent stream.

Seasonal flooding is a recurring problem with 6,700 people displaced in a flood in July 2011. Work to control seasonal flooding to protect the town and farms was to be done the following year.

See also
List of rivers of Angola

References

Rivers of Angola